The European International Cup of Nations was an international football competition held by certain national teams from Central Europe & South Europe between 1927 and 1960. There were competitions for professional and amateur teams. Participating nations were: Italy, Austria, Czechoslovakia, Hungary, Switzerland, Poland, Romania, and (in the final competition) Yugoslavia. Poland and Romania only competed in the amateur competition.

Played as a league on a home and away basis, it was contested six times and each single tournament usually took more than two years to complete. The last two tournaments lasted five years. It was discontinued in 1960, when the European Football Championship started. Winners of the competition included the Austrian Wunderteam of the early 1930s, the Italy team that also won two World Cups in the 1930s, the Golden Team of Hungary and the Czechoslovakia team that later finished as World Cup runners up in 1962.

Trophy
The trophy of the early competitions was named Švehla Cup after Antonín Švehla, the prime minister of Czechoslovakia, who donated it. After the Second World War the new trophy was known as the Dr. Gerö Cup in honour of Josef Gerö, a director of the Austrian Football Association and former match referee.

History  
The competition was conceived by the Austrian football pioneer Hugo Meisl, regarded by some as one of the fathers of European football. Meisl was also behind the launch of the Mitropa Cup, a knockout competition for club teams from the same countries which also began in 1927. He also managed Austria during the  Wunderteam era of the 1930s and led them to victory in the 1931-32 competition.

The first tournament played between 1927 and 1930 had been won by an Italy team inspired by Giuseppe Meazza. Meazza and Italy  also won the 1933-35 competition. This time the team was coached by Vittorio Pozzo and either side of winning this competition they also won two World Cups in 1934 and 1938. The fourth tournament which began in 1936 was eventually abandoned due to the Anschluss Crisis and because of the Second World War, while a fifth tournament was not held until 1948. This tournament marked the advent of the Golden Team of Hungary, coached by Gusztáv Sebes and featuring Ferenc Puskás, Zoltán Czibor, Sándor Kocsis, Nándor Hidegkuti, József Bozsik and Gyula Grosics. They claimed the trophy after a 3–0 win over Italy in Rome in 1953.

Most successful teams

Final placings

Topscorers per tournament

All-time top goalscorers

Most successful players
 Giuseppe Meazza
 Eraldo Monzeglio
 Raimundo Orsi
 Raffaele Costantino
 Alfredo Pitto
  Umberto Caligaris
 Luigi Allemandi
 Virginio Rosetta
 Gianpiero Combi
Winners in 1927–30, 1933–35 and runners-up in 1931–32.

Hat-tricks
Since the first official tournament in 1927–30, 17 hat-tricks have been scored in over 100 matches of the 6 editions of the tournament. The first hat-trick was scored by Gino Rossetti of the Italy, playing against Czechoslovakia on 3 March 1929; and the last was by Lajos Tichy of Hungary, playing against Switzerland on 25 October 1959. The record number of hat-tricks in a single World Cup tournament is five, during the 1931–32. The only player to have scored two hat-tricks is István Avar, both in 1931. György Sárosi holds the record for most goals scored in a single Central European Cup match when he scored 7 for Hungary in an 8–3 win over Austria (6 of which came in the second-half).
Hungary holds the record for most hat-tricks scored with 7 (the next closest are Czechoslovakia and Italy with 3).
Switzerland holds the record for most hat-tricks conceded with 7 (the next closest is Austria with 4).

List

See also
Mitropa Cup – the equivalent for club teams.

References

External links
  Dr. Gerö Cup at RSSSF

 
International association football competitions hosted by Austria
International association football competitions hosted by Czechoslovakia
International association football competitions hosted by Hungary
International association football competitions hosted by Italy
International association football competitions hosted by Switzerland
International association football competitions hosted by Yugoslavia